During the 1997–98 Spanish football season, Real Valladolid competed in La Liga

Season summary
Valladolid were unable to improve on the previous season's seventh-place finish and dropped four places down the table. The club's UEFA Cup excursion was short-lived, as they were swiftly eliminated by Russians Spartak Moscow in the second round. As of 2016, this is the last time Valladolid have competed in European competition.

Squad
Squad at end of season

Left club during season

Results

UEFA Cup

First round

Real Valladolid won 2–1 on aggregate.

Second round

Spartak Moscow won 4–1 on aggregate.

References

External links

Real Valladolid seasons
Real Valladolid